Aleksey Bannikov (born 26 September 1973) is a Kazakhstani freestyle skier. He competed at the 1992, 1994, 1998, and the 2002 Winter Olympics.

References

External links
 

1973 births
Living people
Kazakhstani male freestyle skiers
Olympic freestyle skiers of the Unified Team
Olympic freestyle skiers of Kazakhstan
Freestyle skiers at the 1992 Winter Olympics
Freestyle skiers at the 1994 Winter Olympics
Freestyle skiers at the 1998 Winter Olympics
Freestyle skiers at the 2002 Winter Olympics
Sportspeople from Almaty